Plunk Lake is a reservoir in Van Zandt and Smith counties, in northeast Texas, United States.

References 

Reservoirs in Texas
Protected areas of Smith County, Texas
Protected areas of Van Zandt County, Texas
Bodies of water of Smith County, Texas
Bodies of water of Van Zandt County, Texas